Gadalla is a surname. Notable people with the surname include:

  (born 1980), Danish footballer
 Moustafa Gadalla (born 1944), Egyptian civil engineer and Egyptologist
 Shahinaz Gadalla, physician-scientist and cancer epidemiologist

See also 

 Gadalla Gubara (1920–2008), Sudanese cameraman